MAS proto-oncogene, or MAS1 proto-oncogene, G protein-coupled receptor ('MRGA, MAS, MGRA""), is a protein that in humans is encoded by the MAS1'' gene.
The structure of the MAS1 product indicates that it belongs to the class of receptors that are coupled to GTP-binding proteins and share a conserved structural motif, which is described as a '7-transmembrane segment' following the prediction that these hydrophobic segments form membrane-spanning alpha-helices. The MAS1 protein may be a receptor that, when activated, modulates a critical component in a growth-regulating pathway to bring about oncogenic effects.

Agonists of the receptor include angiotensin-(1-7). Antagonist include A-779 (angiotensin-1-7 with c-terminal proline substituted for D-Ala), or D-Pro (angiotensin-1-7 with c-terminal proline submitted for D-proline). 

Mas1 proto-oncogene (MAS1, MGRA) is not to be confused with the MAS-related G-protein coupled receptor, a recently believed to be activated by the ligand alamandine (generated by catalysis of Ang A via ACE2 or directly from Ang-(1-7)).

See also
 MAS1 oncogene

References

Further reading 

 
 
 
 
 
 
 
 
 
 

G protein-coupled receptors